Marcos Andrés López Cabrera (born 4 February 1993) is an Ecuadorian footballer who plays as a defender for Ecuadorian Serie A side C.D. Cuenca and the Ecuador national team. He made his debut for Ecuador on 6 September 2019 in a match against Peru.

He has tattoos dedicated to his brother and sister on his arm, as well as the Spanish phrase "You taught me the right way to live, I have to choose the right way to die."

References

1993 births
Living people
Ecuadorian footballers
Ecuador international footballers
C.D. Cuenca footballers
C.D. Universidad Católica del Ecuador footballers
L.D.U. Quito footballers
Ecuadorian Serie A players
People from Cuenca, Ecuador
Association football defenders